Marc Huiart (5 July 1936 – 29 July 1962) was a French racing cyclist. He rode in the 1961 Tour de France.

References

1936 births
1962 deaths
French male cyclists
Place of birth missing